The 10th Regiment Illinois Volunteer Cavalry, known informally as "Lincoln's Own", was a cavalry regiment that served in the Union Army during the American Civil War.

Service in the War 
The 10th Illinois Cavalry was mustered into service at Camp Butler, Illinois on November 25, 1861. In January 1862, the regiment moved to Quincy, Illinois, where they underwent additional training.

In December 1862, the unit saw its first major action, outside Prairie Grove, Arkansas. Some member battalions of the 10th aided with the taking of Little Rock and Arkansas Post the following summer.

Members of the regiment were required to obtain their own mounts, which were owned by the individual members until 1864, when the government bought them from the men.

The regiment was disbanded on November 22, 1865, with members receiving their final pay and discharge at Camp Butler on January 6, 1866.

Post war activities
The regiment was ordered into New Orleans in a police action following the assassination of Abraham Lincoln in April 1865. The regiment spent much of the latter part of that year fighting Native Americans outside San Antonio, Texas.

Strength and casualties
The regiment was equipped with six two-pound howitzers upon its arrival in Springfield, Missouri in April 1862, after which the regiment was almost constantly on duty.  The 10th Illinois was made part of the Army of the Frontier and was stationed at Wilson Creek, Missouri.

During the war, the regiment lost one officer and 24 enlisted men in combat. Three officers and 262 enlisted men died of disease, for a total of 290 fatalities over the course of the war.

Commanders 
Colonel James A. Barrett – November 25, 1861 - May 12, 1862 (resigned).
Colonel Dudley Wickersham – November 10th, 1862 - May 10, 1864 (resigned).
Colonel James Stuart – disbanded November 22, 1865.

See also
List of Illinois Civil War Units
Illinois in the American Civil War

References

External links 
The Civil War Archive
10th Illinois Volunteer Cavalry Living History Organization

Units and formations of the Union Army from Illinois
1861 establishments in Illinois
Military units and formations established in 1861
Military units and formations disestablished in 1865